This is the order of battle for the Battle of Carabobo in 1821 in the Venezuelan War of Independence during the Spanish American wars of independence.

Order of battle

References

Spanish American wars of independence orders of battle